Enga Ooru Sippai is a 1991 Indian Tamil language film directed by K. Manimurugan and written by Sangili Murugan. The film stars Arjun, Sree Bhanu and M. N. Nambiar. It was released on 14 April 1991.

Plot

Cast 
Arjun
Sree Bhanu
M. N. Nambiar
Senthamarai
Sangili Murugan
S. S. Chandran
Senthil
Kovai Sarala

Soundtrack 
The music was composed by S. A. Rajkumar.

Reception 
C. R. K. of Kalki criticised the film for being formulaic.

References

External links 
 

1990s Tamil-language films
1991 films
Films scored by S. A. Rajkumar